Eastern District Sports Association (also known as Eastern District) is a semi-professional football club in Hong Kong. The team currently competes in the Hong Kong First Division.

The team play their home matches at Happy Valley Recreation Ground.

History
In the 2002–03 season, the Hong Kong Football Association reformed the Hong Kong Second Division League and the Hong Kong Third Division League. The association suggested different district councils to form a football based in its district. The Eastern District Council therefore formed a football team, while the team started competing in the Hong Kong Third District Division League.

In the 2008–09 season, Eastern District placed 13th out of 15 teams. It had only won 4 matches and lost 10 matches in the league.

In the 2009–10 season, Eastern District appointed ex-Hong Kong National Football Team goalkeeper Goldbert, Chi Chiu as their goalkeeper trainer. Despite that, their league result was worse than the last season. It placed 13th out of 14 teams, only had won 1 match, drawn 1 match, and lost 11 matches.

The team was promoted into the First Division after placing 2nd in the 2015–16 Hong Kong Second Division.

Honours

League
Hong Kong Second Division
Runners-up (1): 2015–16

External links
 Eastern District at HKFA

Football clubs in Hong Kong
Association football clubs established in 2002
2002 establishments in Hong Kong